El Marsa is a town in Algiers Province, Algeria. The population is 11,860.

Postal Code 

The postal code is 16020.

Notable people

References 

Populated places in Algiers Province
Algeria
Cities in Algeria